Oladipo (alternatively spelled "Ladipo"; variant: Oladipupo) is both a Yoruba language surname and a given name meaning "more wealth".
 
Notable people with the name include:

Victor Oladipo (born 1992), American basketball player
Divine Oladipo, British Athlete

Destiny Oladipo, British Football Player

Oladipo Agboluaje (born 1968), British playwright
Oladipo Diya (born 1944), Nigerian general
Oladipo Jadesimi, Nigerian oil businessman
Adebukola Oladipupo, Nigerian actress

References

Yoruba-language surnames